Mats Olof Jingblad (born 9 August 1958) is a Swedish football coach and former footballer who played as a striker.

Club career

Jingblad played for BK Astrio and Halmstads BK. He made a total of 216 appearances for Halmstads BK.

International career 
Jingblad represented the Sweden national team eleven times between 1982 and 1984, scoring eight goals. He also represented the Sweden U19, U21, and Olympic teams between 1976 and 1986.

Management career

Jingblad started his managing career at Halmstads BK, where we won the Svenska Cupen in 1995. In 1996 he joined IFK Göteborg and won the league title the same year. In 2007 he coached IFK Norrköping to promotion to the Swedish top division.

In late 2013 he was announced as the new sporting director of  Hammarby in the second tier in Sweden. He left the club in early 2017, with the club having achieved promotion to the Swedish top division in 2014.

In the summer of 2018 he took over as coach for fifth tier BK Astrio, the club where he once started his career as a player.

Career statistics

International 

International goals

Sweden's score is listed first.

References

External links
 
 

1958 births
Living people
Swedish footballers
Sweden international footballers
Sweden under-21 international footballers
Sweden youth international footballers
Association football forwards
Allsvenskan players
Halmstads BK players
Swedish football managers
Halmstads BK managers
IFK Göteborg managers
Iraklis Thessaloniki F.C. managers
Örebro SK managers
Landskrona BoIS managers
IFK Norrköping managers
Expatriate football managers in Greece
Hammarby Fotboll directors and chairmen
Sportspeople from Halmstad
Sportspeople from Halland County